This Gun for Hire is a 1991 American TV movie. It is an adaptation of A Gun for Sale by Graham Greene which had been filmed several times previously, notably with Alan Ladd in 1942. It was directed by Lou Antonio for the USA Network. It starred Robert Wagner who in 2000 said it was one of his favorite roles.

Cast
Robert Wagner
Nancy Everhard
Patrik Baldauff
Lenore Banks
James Borders
Dean Cochran
George Jones
Fredric Lehne
Joe Warfield

Reception
The Vancouver Sun said "the unlikely romance between Wagner and his stripper hostage, played by Nancy Everhard, never ignites. Wagner's cold and wooden presence only makes Everhard's efforts to seduce him appear ridiculously contrived." The reviewer added what makes the fl "worth watching is a wonderful performance by John Harkins."

The Chicago Tribune wrote "Many viewers may, in fact, find themselves made uncomfortable as they watch the sleek and sophisticated Wagner try to get down and dirty."

References

External links
This Gun for Hire at IMDb
This Gun for Hire at Letterbox DVD

1991 television films
1991 films
American television films
Films directed by Lou Antonio